Lygosominae is the largest subfamily of skinks in the family Scincidae. The subfamily can be divided into a number of genus groups. If the rarely used taxonomic rank of infrafamily is employed, the genus groups would be designated as such, but such a move would require a formal description according to the ICZN standards.

Genera
Several Lygosominae genera were notorious "wastebin taxa" in the past, with scientists assigning more or less closely related species to them in a haphazard fashion and without verifying that the new species were close relatives of the genera's type species. What was once placed in Lygosoma, for example, is now divided among some 15 genera, not all in this subfamily. Similarly, Mabuya and Sphenomorphus are having species moved elsewhere. 
Haackgreerius (monotypic: endemic to coastal Somalia)
Lamprolepis – tree skinks
Lygosoma – writhing skinks
Mochlus - African spp. (synonym Lepidothyris)
Riopa
Subdoluseps

Now placed elsewhere
Egernia group now Subfamily Egerniinae
Corucia – Solomon Islands skink
Cyclodomorphus
Egernia – (paraphyletic: including Bellatorias, Liopholis and Lissolepis, which are better regarded as distinct)
Tiliqua – blue-tongued skinks
Tribolonotus – crocodile skinks

Eugongylus group now Subfamily Eugongylinae
Bassiana (= Acritoscincus) – "cool-skins"
Carlia – four-fingered skinks
Cryptoblepharus – snake-eyed skinks, shining-skinks
Emoia – emoias
Eugongylus – mastiff skinks, short-legged giant skinks
Lampropholis – Indo-Australian ground skinks
Leiolopisma
Lobulia
Niveoscincus – snow skinks, "cool-skins"
Oligosoma
Saproscincus – shade skinks

Mabuya group now Subfamily Mabuyinae
Chioninia – Cape Verde mabuyas (formerly in Mabuya)
Dasia — Southeast Asian tree skinks, including Apterygodon (now considered to be part of Dasia)
Eumecia — Central African elongated skinks 
Eutropis – Asian (formerly in Mabuya)
Heremites — Mediterranean (North Africa and Middle Eastern species) 
Mabuya – American mabuyas
Toenayar — composed of a single species in India/Indochina 
Trachylepis – Afro-Malagasy mabuyas (formerly in Mabuya)

Sphenomorphus group now in subfamily Sphenomorphinae
Anomalopus – worm-skinks
Ctenotus – comb-eared skinks
Eulamprus – water skinks
Eremiascincus
Glaphyromorphus 
Gnypetoscincus – Prickly Skink
Insulasaurus 
Lerista
Lipinia – lipinias
Otosaurus 
Parvoscincus 
Pinoyscincus 
Scincella – ground skinks 
Sphenomorphus – common skinks (paraphyletic) 
Tytthoscincus

Incertae sedis and obsolete genera

Euprepis - obsolete genus
Hemisphaeriodon – pink-tongued skinks
"Hinulia elegans", described by Grey in 1838, is unidentified, but may be Eulamprus tenuis.

References